Edoardo Zambanini (born 21 April 2001) is an Italian cyclist, who currently rides for UCI WorldTeam .

He initially competed in track cycling before switching to the road to become a climbing specialist.

Major results

2018
 7th Trofeo Buffoni
2019
 2nd G.P. Sportivi Sovilla-La Piccola Sanremo
 10th Road race, UEC European Junior Road Championships
2020
 8th Trofeo Città di San Vendemiano
 10th Overall Giro Ciclistico d'Italia
1st  Young rider classification
2021
 6th Ruota d'Oro
 8th Gran Premio Sportivi di Poggiana
 9th Giro del Medio Brenta
2022
 4th Overall Tour de Hongrie
 4th Gran Piemonte

Grand Tour general classification results timeline

References

External links

2001 births
Living people
Italian male cyclists
People from Riva del Garda
Sportspeople from Trentino
Cyclists from Trentino-Alto Adige/Südtirol
21st-century Italian people